Judeo-Shirazi is a dialect of Fars. It is spoken mostly by Persian Jews living in Shiraz and surrounding areas of the Fars Province in Iran.

Vocabulary
The following list of words indicates a few isoglosses distinguishing Judeo-Shirazi from the dialect of Isfahan.

References

Further reading
Lazard, Gilbert. 1968. La Dialectologie du Judeo-Persan. Studies in Bibliography and Booklore 8. 77–98.

External links
Ancient Judeo-Persian Language Kept Alive
Judeo-Shirazi at the Endangered Languages Project

Endangered Iranian languages
Judeo-Persian languages
Languages of Iran
Persian dialects and varieties
Iranian Jews
Culture in Shiraz